Yorkshire Radio was a British digital radio station serving Yorkshire on DAB. The station was owned by Leeds United A.F.C. and broadcast live coverage of all first-team games, alongside pop music from the 1960s to 2013.

History
Yorkshire Radio began test transmissions on 26 June 2006 and launched on 10 July 2006 on the MXR Yorkshire multiplex, replacing jazzfm.com. The first and last song to be played on the station was I Predict a Riot by Leeds band the Kaiser Chiefs.

The station's studios were based at Lowfields Road, behind the east stand of Leeds United's stadium, Elland Road in the Centenary Pavilion. Alongside Leeds United commentaries, Yorkshire Radio also carried coverage of Super League, Leeds Carnegie RUFC and Yorkshire County Cricket Club.

The station closed at 6 pm on 30 July 2013.

On 16 December 2013, broadcasting regulator Ofcom partly upheld a complaint on behalf of former Leeds United director Melvyn Levi, who alleged that Yorkshire Radio had treated him unfairly in a number of broadcasts.

References

External links
 
 Official Leeds United news article
 Yorkshire Post article on Yorkshire Radio
 Yorkshire Radio launches on Sky Digital

Digital-only radio stations
Leeds United F.C.
Mass media in Leeds
Radio stations in Yorkshire
Defunct radio stations in the United Kingdom
Radio stations established in 2006
Radio stations disestablished in 2013